Sarah Seager (born in 1958 Springfield, Massachusetts) is a conceptual artist associated with the California Conceptualism movement of the late 1980s through mid-1990s based out of Los Angeles, California.  She is known for making "clean works, many of them white, in which objects seem not so much removed from function as between functions" as described by Michael Brenson of The New York Times.  She is also known for her published art work by the title "Excuse my Dust" that was done in conjunction with the curators of the Smithsonian Institution.

Life 
Sarah Seager was born in January, 1958, and is the second child of David and Gretchen Seager. She lived for brief periods in Massachusetts, Florida, Texas, then Southern California, where she currently resides.  Sarah received her Bachelor of Arts with Honors, at the University of California, Berkeley, in Spring of 1982.  She was awarded a Master of Fine Arts from the University of California, Los Angeles in the spring of 1987.

Solo exhibitions

2002 
 188 loose elements, things like...., LACE - Los Angeles Contemporary Exhibitions, Los Angeles, CA
1999
  The World Of Sculpture, (theater of invisibles), - Galerie Michael Janssen - Köln, Cologne (closed, 2007)
1998
 Proposal for installation with sarong pants, Claremont Graduate University (catalogue)
1995
  Proposals, Tanja Grunert Gallery, Cologne, Germany
1994 
  Proposals, 1301PE Santa Monica, California
1993 
  Excuse My Dust, 1301PE Santa Monica, California
1992
  New California Artist XX: Sarah Seager - Orange County Museum of Art, Newport Beach, California
1991 
  Luhring Augustine, New York, New York
  Burnett Miller Gallery, Los Angeles, California
1989
  Dennis Anderson Gallery, Los Angeles, CA

Collections 

 Museum of Contemporary Art, Los Angeles
 San Francisco Museum of Modern Art

References
-

Living people
1958 births
American conceptual artists
Women conceptual artists
21st-century American women artists